Putu Wiradamungga (born December 2, 1991 in Bangli) is an Indonesian judoka. He competed in the men's 81 kg event at the 2012 Summer Olympics and was eliminated in the second round by László Csoknyai.

References

1991 births
Living people
Indonesian male judoka
Olympic judoka of Indonesia
Judoka at the 2012 Summer Olympics
Judoka at the 2014 Asian Games
Balinese people
People from Bangli Regency
Sportspeople from Bali
Southeast Asian Games medalists in judo
Southeast Asian Games bronze medalists for Indonesia
Kurash practitioners at the 2018 Asian Games
Competitors at the 2013 Southeast Asian Games
Asian Games competitors for Indonesia